Ha*Ash is the self-titled debut album by American Latin pop duo Ha*Ash. It was officially released on May 11, 2003, under the Sony Music label.

Five singles and one promotional single were released from the album. Its lead single, "Odio Amarte", was released in April 2002. "Estés Donde Estés" was chosen as the album's second single, released in 2003. The next singles were "Te Quedaste", "Soy Mujer" and "Si Pruebas una Vez".

Background and production 
In April 2002, they signed to Sony Music Latin when they were 15 and 16. They recorded their self-titled debut album Ha*Ash with the Mexican producer Áureo Baqueiro in 2003 and it was recorded between 2002 and 2003. Mabel worked with writers and producers such as Áureo Baqueiro, Ángela Dávalos and Mónica Vélez to create the album, with its music incorporating the genres of pop and country.

Release and promotion 
It was officially released on May 11, 2003, under the Sony Latin label. After the success of their first album, a special edition of the album was released. It features videos of their first three singles: "Odio Amarte", "Estés Donde Estés" and "Te Quedaste"; behind the scenes footage of the videos, karaoke and an interview with Hanna and Ashley about the promotion of their album.

Singles 

 "Odio Amarte" (I Hate to Love You) launched in April 2003.
 "Estés Donde Estés" (Wherever You Are) was chosen as the album second single and released in 2003 and was selected as the main theme of the telenovela Clap... your dream by Televisa. It peaked at #9 on Billboard Latin Pop chart and #14 on Billboard Hot Latin Tracks.
 "Te Quedaste" (You Stayed) was released as the album's third single in 2003. It peaked at #17 on Billboard Latin Pop chart and #28 on Billboard Hot Latin Tracks.
 "Soy Mujer" (I'm a Woman) launched in April 2004. It peaked at #7 on Monitor Latino in México.
 "Si Pruebas una Vez" (If You Try Once) launched in November 2004. It peaked at #5 on Monitor Latino in México.

Commercial performance 
The album peaked at #3 in the Mexican album charts and #19 in the US Billboard Latin Pop Albums. In February 2004, they received their first gold record for more than 75,000 copies of their debut album sold in Mexico. In March 2004, Ha*Ash prepared to launch the album in Puerto Rico and the United States. In March 2004, Ha*Ash received a platinum record for sales of 140,000 copies. The album was eventually certified platinum + gold in Mexico.

Track listing

Credits and personnel
Credits adapted from the album's liner notes.

Musicians

 Ashley Grace – vocals 
 Hanna Nicole – vocals 
 Armando Ávila: bass , acoustic guitar , electric guitar , keyboards 
 Áureo Baqueiro: keyboards , background vocals 
 Sabo Romo: bajo , acoustic guitar , electric guitar 
 Michelle Batrez: background vocals 
 Fanny Chernitsky: background vocals 
 Mongus: guitar 
 Pepe Damián: drums

Production

 Áureo Baqueiro: producer , recording engineer , arrangements 
 Armando Ávila: recording engineer , arrangements 
 Rodolfo Cruz: recording engineer , mixing 
 Rodolfo Vázques: mixing 
 Sabo Romo: arrangements 
 Luis Gil: mastering

Charts

Certifications

Album

Edition Deluxe (DVD)

Awards

Release history

References

External links 

2003 debut albums
Ha*Ash albums
Spanish-language albums
Sony Music Latin albums